Nai Phuan Ong (born 10 September 1948 in Penang, Malaysia) is an American experimental physicist, specializing in "condensed matter physics focusing on topological insulators, Dirac/Weyl semimetals, superconductors and quantum spin liquids."

Biography
Nai Phuan Ong was born in Penang, Malaysia to parents of Chinese origin on 10 September 1948. He grew up speaking a Chinese dialect with his parents and English with his seven siblings. As a youth, he attended Saint Xaviers Institution, run by the Christian Brothers, where classes were taught in English. His interest in science was spurred by his sister's library books; he started going to the library himself at the age of ten and read books about science and airplanes, fascinated to learn how they fly. He started building toy airplanes and copying drawings of turbine blades and pistons in jet engines. 

Ong immigrated to the United States with his family in 1967. He won a scholarship to Columbia College, the oldest undergraduate college of Columbia University, and graduated from there in 1971 with a B.A. in physics. He went on to complete a Ph.D., in 1976, under the direction of Alan Portis, from the University of California, Berkeley. At the University of Southern California, Ong was an assistant professor from 1976 to 1982, an associate professor 1982 to 1984, and a full professor in 1985. He joined the faculty at Princeton University as a full professor in 1985. In 2003, he was appointed to the Eugene Higgins Professorship of Physics, which he continues to hold. Ong was a member of the editorial board of the journal Science from January 2012 to February 2014.

He has been the advisor for many doctoral students, including Harold Y. Hwang, and many post-docs, including Kathryn Moler.

In 1982 Ong married Delicia Lai (born 1960).

Research
In the 1970s and 1980s Ong did important research on charge-density waves. After the discovery of high temperature superconductivity, Ong worked on transport phenomena in cuprate semiconductors. In recent years, Ong has done research on Dirac and Weyl semimetals, the thermal Hall effect, and topological superconductors.

Awards and honors
 1982–1984  — Alfred P. Sloan Research Fellowship
 1989 — elected a Fellow of the American Physical Society, "For research on transport properties of low-dimensional systems, especially the phenomena of sliding charge-density waves"
 2006 — H. Kamerlingh Onnes Prize (shared with Hidenori Takagi and Shin-ichi Uchida) "for pioneering and seminal transport experiments which illuminated the unconventional nature of the metallic state of high temperature superconducting cuprates"
 2006 — elected a Fellow of the American Academy of Arts and Sciences
 2010 — Lecturer in Distinguished Lecture Series, Lewiner Institute for Theoretical Physics, Technion, Haifa (3 lectures on cuprates and topological insulators), April 28-May 4, 2010
 2010 — elected a Fellow of the American Association for the Advancement of Sciences
2012 — elected a Member of the U.S. National Academy of Sciences
2014 — Experimental Investigators in Quantum Materials Award from Gordon and Betty Moore Foundation
2014–2018  — listed among Thomas Reuters Highly Cited Researchers

Patents
1991 — with Zhao Z. Wang: U.S. Patent No. 4,996.186 "Flux Method for producing crystals of YBa2Cu3O7"
2016 — with Ali Yazdani and Robert J. Cava: U.S. Patent No. 9331020: "Electronic interconnects and devices with topological surface states and methods for fabricating same."

Selected publications
 with Ravin Bhatt:  More is Different: Fifty Years of Condensed Matter Physics,  Princeton University Press, 2001

References

External links 

 Oral history interview transcript with Nai Phuan Ong on 10 December 2020, American Institute of Physics, Niels Bohr Library & Archives

1948 births
Living people
20th-century American physicists
21st-century American physicists
Columbia College (New York) alumni
University of California, Berkeley alumni
University of Southern California faculty
Princeton University faculty
Experimental physicists
Fellows of the American Academy of Arts and Sciences
Fellows of the American Association for the Advancement of Science
Fellows of the American Physical Society
Members of the United States National Academy of Sciences
People with acquired American citizenship
Sloan Research Fellows